Crislan Henrique da Silva de Sousa (born 13 March 1992), simply known as Crislan, is a Brazilian footballer who plays as a striker for Brusque.

Player career
Born in Teresina, Piauí, Crislan made his senior debuts with Comercial AC before joining Belo Jardim in 2012, on loan from River. He subsequently returned to the latter in April, appearing regularly and being the club's top scorer with six goals in Campeonato Piauiense.

On 27 December 2012 Crislan joined Série A club Atlético Paranaense, initially assigned to the under-23 team. Despite being a starter in 2013 Campeonato Paranaense, he was loaned to Boa Esporte on 26 September 2013, until December.

Crislan only appeared rarely and subsequently returned to Furacão in January 2014. After being again with the under-23s, he joined Náutico on 10 July, on loan until the end of the season.

On 29 November 2014 Crislan announced his departure from Timbu, and also signed for Penapolense. After scoring nine goals in 2015 Campeonato Paulista, he was linked to Santos and a number of clubs from Rio de Janeiro.

On 1 July 2015 Crislan signed a five-year deal with S.C. Braga. He made his Primeira Liga debut on 16 August, starting in a 2–1 home win against C.D. Nacional, and scored his first goal late in the month, netting the third in a 4–0 home routing of Boavista F.C.

On 27 July 2016, he joined C.D. Tondela of Primeira Liga on a one-year loan.

In 2021, Crislan joined Bucheon FC 1995 of K League 2.

In 2022, he moved to Brusque of Campeonato Brasileiro Série B.

Updated to 22 February 2018.

Honours
Braga
Taça de Portugal: 2015–16
Vegalta Sendai
J1.League Monthly Best Goal: 2017
J.League Cup Top Scorer: 2017

References

External links

Profile at Shimizu S-Pulse

1992 births
Living people
Sportspeople from Piauí
Brazilian footballers
Brazilian expatriate footballers
Association football forwards
Campeonato Brasileiro Série B players
J1 League players
K League 2 players
Belo Jardim Futebol Clube players
Club Athletico Paranaense players
Boa Esporte Clube players
Clube Náutico Capibaribe players
Clube Atlético Penapolense players
Primeira Liga players
S.C. Braga players
C.D. Tondela players
Vegalta Sendai players
Shimizu S-Pulse players
Shonan Bellmare players
Bucheon FC 1995
Expatriate footballers in Portugal
Expatriate footballers in Japan
Expatriate footballers in South Korea
Brazilian expatriate sportspeople in Portugal
Brazilian expatriate sportspeople in Japan
Brazilian expatriate sportspeople in South Korea